Kim Mi-sook (born June 10, 1962) is a South Korean team handball player and Olympic medalist. She received a silver medal with the Korean team at the 1984 Summer Olympics in Los Angeles.

References

External links

1962 births
Living people
South Korean female handball players
Olympic handball players of South Korea
Handball players at the 1984 Summer Olympics
Handball players at the 1988 Summer Olympics
Olympic silver medalists for South Korea
Olympic medalists in handball
Medalists at the 1984 Summer Olympics
Medalists at the 1988 Summer Olympics